Luis Sergio Bates Hidalgo (born 25 August 1934) is a Chilean lawyer and politician who served as Minister of Justice from 2003 to 2006.

References

External links
 Profile at Chile Transparente

Living people
1934 births
21st-century Chilean politicians
University of Chile alumni
Complutense University of Madrid alumni
Christian Democratic Party (Chile) politicians
Presidents of the State Defense Council of Chile
Chilean Ministers of Justice